Omocestus haemorrhoidalis is a species belonging to the family Acrididae  subfamily Gomphocerinae.It is found across Europe.  It inhabits low-vegetation, sandy to stony ground areas, also adjacent to grasslands

References

Orthoptera of Europe
haemorrhoidalis
Insects described in 1825